Kurt Pfammatter (30 March 1941 – 24 July 2022) was a Swiss professional ice hockey player.

In 1962, Pfammatter helped HC Viège to win the Swiss national championship, scoring two goals in 20 seconds in a decisive match against Davos. He represented the Switzerland national team at the 1964 Winter Olympics. He died in hospital at Brigue, aged 81.

After retiring from his sporting career, Pfammatter ran a hotel-restaurant near the Litterna-Halle stadium at Visp.

References

External links
Kurt Pfammatter's stats at Sports-Reference.com

1941 births
2022 deaths
Ice hockey players at the 1964 Winter Olympics
Olympic ice hockey players of Switzerland
Swiss ice hockey forwards
People from Visp (district)